Stay Cool is a 2009 American comedy film directed by Michael Polish (credited as Ted Smith), and written by Mark Polish. The film stars Winona Ryder, Mark Polish, Hilary Duff, Sean Astin, Josh Holloway, Jon Cryer, and Chevy Chase. The film premiered at the 2009 Tribeca Film Festival and released theatrically in 2011.

Henry McCarthy, a successful author, is invited back to his old high school to give the commencement address for the class 19 years after his. He finally has to face his past demons to be able to move on as a person and a writer.

Cast 
 Mark Polish as Henry McCarthy
 Winona Ryder as Scarlet Smith
 Hilary Duff as Shasta O' Neil
 Josh Holloway as Wino 
 Max Thieriot as Luke 
 Sean Astin as Big Girl
 Chevy Chase as Principal Marshall
 Jon Cryer as Javier
 Marc Blucas as Brad Nelson
 Frances Conroy as Mrs. Looch

Production
Stay Cool was filmed between July and September 2008 in Santa Clarita, Saugus and Valencia (California).

Release
A film festival version of Stay Cool was shown at the Tribeca Film Festival on April 23, 2009 and received favorable reviews.  It was presented under the category for "World Narrative Film Festival".  On the official Tribeca Film Festival it was described as a film that "...reminds us that time certainly does fly and old flames are hard to put out." A version of the film was also premiered in May 2010 at the Marché du Film of Cannes (France).

It had a September 16, 2011 theatrical release in the United States.

Reception
MTV ranked the film #5 on the "Top 10 Movies That Will Have You Screaming 'Oh My God!'" calling it "the most adult-minded movie on this list".

On Rotten Tomatoes the film has a rating of 14% based on reviews from 7 critics.

Robert Abele of the Los Angeles Times wrote: "Attempts to pay homage to the '80s oeuvre of filmmaker John Hughes, but its singular lack of emotional logic, charm and humor bring to mind a couple of hours in detention instead."

References

External links
 
 

2009 films
2000s English-language films
2009 comedy films
American comedy films
Films directed by Michael Polish
American independent films
2009 independent films
2000s American films